Amanda Lynn Steele (born July 26, 1999) is an American video blogger, model, and actress. She started her YouTube channel, MakeupByMandy24, in 2010. Steele is known for her beauty and fashion related content. She signed to IMG Models in early 2016. In 2015, she started a collaboration with Quay Australia for an exclusive sunglass line. She starred in the first season of the AwesomenessTV web series, Guidance which was originally published on Go90. In 2021, she gave an interview for Vanity Teen magazine on the occasion of the premiere of her new TV show Paradise City.

Early life 
Amanda Lynn Steele was born on July 26, 1999 in Huntington Beach, California. Her sister, Lauren, is five years older. She grew up and attended school in Huntington Beach, but switched to homeschooling at age fourteen. Steele is also a former cheerleader and softball player. In October 2022, she announced that she is expecting her first child with the Colombian model Francisco Escobar.

Filmography

Discography 
 Gateway (2015)

References

External links
 

1999 births
Living people
People from Huntington Beach, California
American female models
American YouTubers
IMG Models models
Streamy Award winners
Fashion YouTubers
Beauty and makeup YouTubers
21st-century American women